Clan Macnaghten (sometimes spelt as MacNachten, MacNaughton, McNaughton or McNorton), Scottish Gaelic: MacNeachdain, is a Scottish clan.

History

Origins of the clan

Traditional origins
The Clan Macnaghten are amongst the Scottish clans who claim descent from the early Pictish rulers of the Mormaer of Moray. The name Nectan means pure or clear and was popular in at least one Pictish royal branch.

Recorded origins
Three brothers are recorded in the thirteenth century: Gilchrist, Athe and Gilbert, all sons of Malcolm Macnachten. In 1297 Gilchrist received a charter from Alexander III of Scotland which granted to him the keepership of a castle warding the narrow Pass of Brander, which was the gateway to the west.

Wars of Scottish Independence

The Macnaghtens came to Loch Awe and as a result became neighbours of the powerful and acquisitive Clan Campbell. The Campbells were quick to support Robert the Bruce when he set out to claim his throne; however, the Macnaghtens, who were under the influence of the Clan MacDougall, opposed him. The Macnaghtens formed part of the MacDougall host that fought against Robert the Bruce's army at the Battle of Dalrigh in 1306 and again at the Battle of the Pass of Brander. However the Macnaghtens later changed their allegiance and a Baron Macnachten (possibly Alexander Macnachten) is recorded as fighting at the Battle of Bannockburn for the Bruce during the Wars of Scottish Independence. The Macnaghtens did not gain much from their late change of allegiance and from that point onwards the Campbells dominated Loch Awe.

The second wife of Alexander Macnaghten, who may have fought at Bannockburn, was Christina Campbell. When she became a widow in 1361 she granted one third of the Macnaghten lands to her cousin, Colin Campbell of Lochow. Alexander Macnaghten's son, Duncan, succeeded to the rest of the lands. His seat was at Dunderave Castle and Dunderave became the territorial designation of the clan chiefs.

15th and 16th centuries

In 1478 Duncan's heir, Alexander, accepted a charter from the Campbell Earls of Argyll for his lands and thus accepted them as feudal superiors. His grandson, also called Alexander, was knighted by James IV of Scotland. He followed the king to the Battle of Flodden and was one of the few survivors of the battle. He died two years later but had married twice and left six sons, the eldest of which succeeded as clan chief. The second son was Ian, father of another Ian or John Dhu who could be the Shane Dhu who is credited with founding the Irish branch of Clan Macnaghten.

Gilbert Macnaghten succeeded as clan chief in 1548 but died without issue and was therefore succeeded by his younger brother, Alexander. Alexander started the rebuilding of Dunderave Castle on Loch Fyne which was completed by his son, Iain, in 1596.

17th century and Civil War
 
The Macnaghten chiefs raised a force of bowmen to go and assist the French Huguenot rebels in the Siege of La Rochelle in 1627. The chief of Clan Macnaghten was in high favour with Charles I of England and served as a Gentlemen of the Privy Chamber but the expense of the French expedition and the extravagance of living in court forced Macnaghten to mortgage his lands. Alexander died in 1630 leaving Dunderave in the hands of his brother, Macolm Macnaghten of Killearn.

Malcolm's son was a royalist and called out his clan to fight in Glencairn's rising against Oliver Cromwell in 1653. After the Restoration of 1660 Macnaghten was knighted but through the influence of Campbell, Earl of Argyll he was later denounced as a rebel. As a result, the clan lands were nearly entirely lost by debt and the next chief, Iain, inherited little more than an empty title.

Iain joined the forces of John Graham, 1st Viscount Dundee and fought at the Battle of Killiecrankie in 1689. As a result, he was denounced as a Jacobite rebel and his remaining lands were forfeited. His younger son, John Macnaghten, was the last chief of this line. John was forced to make a formal disposition of his remaining lands to Sir James Campbell of Ardkinglas in 1710.

Modern history

In 1818 Edmund Alexander Macnaghten was recognized as the new clan chief. He was descended from the Irish branch of Macnaghtens who are descended from John Macnaughten Shane Dhu of the 16th century. Edmund Alexander Macnaghten died in 1832 and was succeeded by his brother, Francis, who was a judge in Madras and Calcutta. Francis was a distinguished lawyer and became a Lord of Appeal in 1887. He was succeeded by his son, Sir Edward, whose two sons were both killed in World War I. They were succeeded by their uncle Sir Francis, eighth Baronet.

Clan Chief

Clan chief: Sir Malcolm MacNaghten of MacNaghten, Bt.

Castles
Castles that have been owned by the MacNaughtons or MacNaughts, who were a branch of the MacNaughtons, have included:

Dubh Loch Castle, once stood by the side of Loch Dubh, north-east of Inveraray, in Argyll, but nothing now remains except for a mound. The clan made Dunderave their main seat during the fifteenth century with Dubh Loch Castle being abandoned, apparently because an outbreak of plague.
Dundarave Castle, which is not far from Dubh Loch Castle, and is three miles east of Inveraray on the north bank of Loch Fyne is a restored L-plan tower house. It has a large round tower on one corner and dates from 1596. The last MacNaughton holder of the castle was Iain MacNaughton who intended to wed the younger daughter of Sir James Campbell. However he found that he had been tricked into marrying the wrong woman. He then fled to Ireland with his love, the younger daughter. The castle then passed to the Campbells in about 1689. Iain MacNaughton had been a Jacobite who had fought at the Battle of Killiecrankie which is another reason why he did not stay. The castle became ruinous but was restored in 1911-12 for the Noble family and it is still occupied. The MacNaughton line continued to flourish however, and now reside at Dundarave House (or "Dunderawe"), Bushmills, Antrim, Northern Ireland.
Fraoch Eilean, Loch Awe, two miles north-east of Inveraray, Argyll is an island with the ruins of what was a strong castle, with a hall house and courtyard. It dates from the twelfth or thirteenth centuries and was occupied for around four hundred years. It was held by the MacNaughtons from 1267 but later passed to the Campbells.
Crogo, ten miles north of Castle Douglas in Dumfries and Galloway is the site of a tower house that stood in its own park, although there are no remains. The lands were held by the MacNaughts but passed to the Gordons in the fifteenth century. 
Kilquhanty, also north of Castle Douglas, is the site of a castle or old house that also had its own park. The lands were held by the MacNaughts from 1360 to 1680. The present mansion was built in 1820 and is used as a school.

Clan profile
Chief's Motto: I hope in God.
Chief's Slogan & War Cry: "Fraoch Eilean" (The Heathery Isle).
Chief's Crest: A castle embattled, Gules.
Clan Badge: Trailing Azalea.

Historical forms of the name
Macnaghten, Macnauchtan, Macnachten, Macnaught, MacNaughtan, Macnaughtan, Macnaughtens, MacNaughton, Macnaughton, Macnechtan, McNaughton, McNaughten, McNaughtan, McNaught, McNaughton.

Notes

References

External links
Clan Macnachtan Association Worldwide
Clan Macnachtan Association Worldwide Twitter Account

Macnaghten